Alonza Westbrook "Buddy" Lucas (16 August 1914 – 18 March 1983) was an American jazz saxophonist and bandleader, who is possibly more famous for his session work on harmonica.

As a bandleader, he led bands such as Buddy Lucas & His Band of Tomorrow, the Gone All Stars, and Buddy Lucas & His Shouters, and he also went under the stage name of "Big" Buddy Lucas.

As a session musician, he recorded with Horace Silver, Bernard "Pretty" Purdie, Titus Turner The Rascals, Yusef Lateef, and Aretha Franklin, amongst others.  He also played sax on Dion and the Belmonts (and Dion's later solo recordings) on Laurie Records.

He was born in Rockville, Alabama, and died in Stamford, Connecticut, aged 68.

Discography
As leader/co-leader
1952: "Hustlin' Family Blues"/"I'll Never Smile Again" - Buddy Lucas and His Band of Tomorrow 
1952: "Drive Daddy Drive" - Little Sylvia Sings with Buddy Lucas and His Band of Tomorrow 
1954: "A Million Tears" - Little Sylvia Sings with Buddy Lucas Orchestra 
1956: "Blueberry Hill"
1957: "Bo-Lee"/"Star Dust"
1957: "Hound Dog"/"When My Dreamboat Comes Home" - Buddy Lucas with Jimmy Carrol & Orchestra 
1957: "Searchin'" Buddy Lucas
1967: Honkin' Sax
As sideman
1956: Fever - Little Willie John 
1963: Hobo Flats - Jimmy Smith
1963: Tread Ye Lightly - Clark Terry and Bob Brookmeyer
1964: Unforgettable: A Tribute to Dinah Washington – Aretha Franklin
1966: Hoochie Coochie Man – Jimmy Smith
1967: Nina Simone Sings the Blues - Nina Simone
1967: Singing the Blues - Joe Turner
1967: Soul Drums – Bernard Purdie
1967: More Than a New Discovery - Laura Nyro
1967: Groove Merchant - Jerome Richardson
1967: Cherry Red - Eddie "Cleanhead" Vinson
1968: New Grass - Albert Ayler
1968: Once Upon a Dream - The Rascals
1968: The Blue Yusef Lateef - Yusef Lateef
1971: Quiet Fire - Roberta Flack
1971: Afrique – Count Basie
1972: The Prophet - Johnny Hammond
1973: Sassy Soul Strut - Lou Donaldson
1974: Sweet Lou - Lou Donaldson
1974: Potpourri - The Thad Jones/Mel Lewis Orchestra
1975: Midnight Lightning Jimi Hendrix (posthumous)
1976: A Street Called Straight - Roy Buchanan
2005: The Soul of Nina Simone - Nina Simone (recorded 1963-1987)

References

External links
 
 Entries at 45cat.com

American jazz saxophonists
American male saxophonists
American rhythm and blues musicians
African-American saxophonists
American bandleaders
1914 births
1983 deaths
20th-century American saxophonists
20th-century American male musicians
American male jazz musicians
20th-century African-American musicians